The Rhodesian Grand Prix was an open-wheel motor race held in the 1960s and 70s, most often as a round of the South African Formula One Championship. During that time it played host to wide variety of racing cars, Formula One, Formula 5000, Formula Two, Formula Atlantic as well as locally created racing cars.

Originally held on an airfield circuit in Belvedere, Salisbury, the race moved to another airfield circuit, the James McNeillie Circuit in Bulawayo for ten years. In 1971 the race moved to the purpose-built facility, the Breedon Everard Raceway in Bulawayo before moving to its final home at Donnybrook Raceway in Harare.

Rhodesian driver John Love was the most accomplished, winning the race six times between 1963 and 1972.

Winners of the Rhodesian Grand Prix

References 

Formula One non-championship races
National Grands Prix
Grand Prix
Recurring sporting events established in 1960